20th Century Masters – The Christmas Collection: The Best of Reba McEntire is a compilation of songs from Reba McEntire's two Christmas albums (Merry Christmas to You and The Secret of Giving: A Christmas Collection) for release in 2003 on a 20th Century Masters Christmas collection.  No new material was recorded for the compilation.

Track listing

Critical reception

20th Century Masters – The Christmas Collection: The Best of Reba McEntire received three out of five stars from William Ruhlmann of Allmusic. In his review, Ruhlmann describes McEntire's versions of "Silent Night" and "Up on the Housetop" as "appropriately reverent," while "This Is My Prayer for You" is the "most memorable" of the non-standards.

Chart performance
20th Century Masters – The Christmas Collection: The Best of Reba McEntire peaked at number 67 on the U.S. Billboard Top Country Albums chart.

References

McEntire, Reba
Albums produced by Jimmy Bowen
Albums produced by David Malloy
Reba McEntire compilation albums
Christmas compilation albums
2003 Christmas albums
Christmas albums by American artists
2003 greatest hits albums
MCA Records compilation albums
Country Christmas albums